The open water swimming events at the 2007 World Aquatics Championships were held from 18 to 25 March, at St. Kilda Beach near Melbourne, Australia.

Medal table 

Record(*)

Medal summary

Men

Women

See also
Open water swimming at the 2005 World Aquatics Championships
2008 FINA World Open Water Championships
Swimming at the 2008 Summer Olympics
Open water swimming at the 2009 World Aquatics Championships

References

Open Water results section of the 2007 World Championships results from OmegaTiming.com; retrieved 2019-07-18.

 
2007 in swimming
Open Water
Open water swimming at the World Aquatics Championships